Barnhill railway station served the suburb of Barnhill, Perth and Kinross, Scotland, from 1847 to 1849 by the Dundee and Perth Railway.

History 
This short-lived station opened on 24 May 1847 by the Dundee and Perth Railway. It provided a terminus from  until the line was extended to Perth on 1 March 1849 when the station closed.

References

External links 

Disused railway stations in Perth and Kinross
Railway stations in Great Britain opened in 1847
Railway stations in Great Britain closed in 1849
1847 establishments in Scotland
1849 disestablishments in Scotland
Railway stations in Perth, Scotland